Bedell Cristin is an offshore law firm that provides legal services in financial jurisdictions for corporate clients, financial institutions, and private clients. It has offices in the British Virgin Islands, Cayman Islands, Guernsey, Jersey, London, and Singapore.

History 
Advocate George Bedell set up his practice at 21 Hill Street, St Helier, Jersey in 1939. He had previously been commissioned to introduce income tax to the island and was appointed the first Controller of Income Tax for Jersey in 1928. 

After moving back to England during the war, he returned to Jersey and set up in partnership with another prominent lawyer, Dick Cristin. Founding Bedell and Cristin, as it was then known, in 1958.

Dick Cristin helped pioneer the abolition of the statutory 5% cap on interest rates in 1962.

References

External links 
 Bedell Cristin - Legal 500

Offshore law firms
Offshore magic circle
Companies of Jersey